Alexander Andreyevich Shin (born November 21, 1985) is a Kazakhstani professional ice hockey player.

Career statistics

International

External links

1985 births
Barys Nur-Sultan players
Competitors at the 2013 Winter Universiade
Living people
Kazakhstani ice hockey left wingers
Kazzinc-Torpedo players
Saryarka Karagandy players
Sportspeople from Oskemen
Universiade medalists in ice hockey
Universiade silver medalists for Kazakhstan